Mariana Isabel Paiz Quan (born 4 July 2000) is a Guatemalan badminton player. She competed at the 2015 Pan American Games. Paiz was part of the national team that won the bronze medal at the 2018 Central American and Caribbean Games in Barranquilla, Colombia.

Achievements

Pan Am Championships 
Women's doubles

Mixed doubles

BWF International Challenge/Series (4 titles, 9 runners-up) 
Women's doubles

Mixed doubles

  BWF International Challenge tournament
  BWF International Series tournament
  BWF Future Series tournament

References

External links 
 

2000 births
Living people
Guatemalan female badminton players
Badminton players at the 2015 Pan American Games
Pan American Games competitors for Guatemala
Competitors at the 2018 Central American and Caribbean Games
Central American and Caribbean Games bronze medalists for Guatemala
Central American and Caribbean Games medalists in badminton